Theresa Lee Farrell (born November 19, 1963) is an American actress and fashion model. She is best known for her roles as Jadzia Dax in the television series Star Trek: Deep Space Nine and as Regina "Reggie" Kostas in the comedy series Becker.

Early life
In her junior year of high school, the almost six-foot-tall Farrell submitted her image to the Elite modeling agency in New York City. Shortly after, at the age of 16, she was invited to New York City and, within two days of arriving, had an exclusive contract with Mademoiselle. She went on to appear on the covers of the Italian and German editions of Vogue, and was also featured in numerous editorials for American Vogue.

Career

After 18 months of modeling, she studied acting while still modeling on the side. Her first major roles were in the short-lived 1984 television series Paper Dolls, playing a model, and in the feature film Back to School (in her film debut) with Rodney Dangerfield, playing love interest to Keith Gordon’s character. In 1986, Farrell appeared in an episode of The Twilight Zone.

In 1989, she began studying acting with Stella Adler and appeared in a number of guest-starring roles in series, including Quantum Leap and The Cosby Show. In 1992, she played Cat in a second pilot for a U.S. version of Red Dwarf, which was not picked up.

Soon after the Red Dwarf USA project folded, she was offered a lead role in Star Trek: Deep Space Nine. Farrell starred as Jadzia Dax, the space station's Starfleet science officer, a character from an alien species known as the Trill, who is host to a 300-year-old symbiont, and can draw upon the memories and knowledge of the symbiont's seven previous hosts. The series debuted in January 1993. When she left the show at the end of the sixth season, Paramount killed off Farrell's "host" character (though continuing the "symbiont" character in a new Dax host, played by Nicole DeBoer).

Farrell then co-starred on Paramount's television comedy series Becker. She played Regina "Reggie" Kostas, foil and love interest to Ted Danson's John Becker, for four years and 94 episodes, before her character was written out of the show. Farrell told the Tampa Bay Times that she was fired from the show just after the season-four cliffhanger finale aired. She told the paper that she was completely surprised by the firing.

Farrell also provided the voice of Six of One in the animated short film Tripping the Rift, which eventually became a Sci-Fi Channel TV series with other actors providing the voice of Six. First released independently on the Internet, Tripping the Rift originally featured Patricia Beckmann as the voice of Six and was replaced by Farrell's voice for an episode of the Sci-Fi Channel's short film series Exposure, in which Farrell was guest host. Farrell's version of Six was heard only once on television.

Farrell retired in 2002 after marrying actor Brian Baker.  They divorced in 2015, and Farrell played a role in the web-released fan film Star Trek: Renegades. She is expected to appear in the same role in episodes of  Renegades, which strips mention of Star Trek for legal purposes.

Personal life
Farrell retired from acting to concentrate on her family. She lived in Hershey, Pennsylvania, with her husband, former Sprint Corporation spokesman Brian Baker and their son, Max. She enjoys sewing and yoga.
Farrell appeared with Baker at the Hershey Area Playhouse in Hershey, in a production of A. R. Gurney's Love Letters. Farrell and Baker have been divorced since December 2015.

In August 2015, she was reportedly in a relationship with Adam Nimoy and Farrell confirmed on Twitter that they were engaged. Farrell and Nimoy were married in San Francisco on March 26, 2018, Leonard Nimoy's 87th birthday. The marriage ended in divorce in 2022.

Farrell and her Star Trek: Deep Space Nine co-star Nana Visitor were honored in 2001 when William Kwong Yu Yeung named two small Solar System bodies he had discovered after them – asteroid 26734 Terryfarrell and asteroid 26733 Nanavisitor.

Filmography

Film

Television

Video games

References

External links

1963 births
Actresses from Iowa
American adoptees
Female models from Iowa
American film actresses
American television actresses
American voice actresses
Living people
Actors from Cedar Rapids, Iowa
People from Hershey, Pennsylvania
20th-century American actresses
21st-century American actresses